Nearing Grace is a 2005 film directed by Rick Rosenthal, based on the novel by Scott Sommer.

Plot
High school senior Henry Nearing (Gregory Smith) has to cope with the death of his mother and is also forced to come to terms with evolving from a self-absorbed and confused adolescent to accepting the responsibilities of early adulthood. Unfortunately his father, Shep (David Morse) and his older brother, Blair (David Moscow), don't offer any kind of guidance and find themselves detaching at the seams. His father quits his teaching job, buys a motorcycle, as well as becomes a perpetual drunk, while his brother takes off to live as a transient doper. To make things even more complicated, Henry has two young women on his mind: the sexy, wealthy, as well as very popular Grace (Jordana Brewster) and childhood friend Merna (Ashley Johnson)—one girl drives him crazy, the other girl keeps him sane.

Cast
Gregory Smith as Henry
David Morse as Shep
David Moscow as Blair
Jordana Brewster as Grace
Ashley Johnson as Merna

Soundtrack
 "Concerto for Violin and Orchestra in D Major op 35" Canzonetta Andante Tchaikovsky
 "Sleepwalker" Written and performed by The Kinks
 "Love Is Like Oxygen" Written by Andrew David Scott Performed by Sweet
 "Teenage Kicks" Written by John O’Neill Performed by The Undertones
 "If You See Her, Say Hello" Written by Bob Dylan Performed by Bob Dylan
 "All By Myself" Written by Eric Carmen and Sergei Rachmaninoff Performed by Ashley Johnson
 "Got to Give It Up" Written by Marvin Gaye Performed by Marvin Gaye
 "Time Has Told Me" Written by Nick Drake Performed by Nick Drake
 "Slow Motions" Written by Nevin Gamble and Leon Huff Performed by Johnny Williams
 "Crimson and Clover" Written by Tommy James and Peter Lucia Performed by Tommy James and the Shondells
 "I’ll Be Your Mirror" Written by Lou Reed Performed by The Velvet Underground
  Music from The Incredible Hulk
 "(Don't Fear) The Reaper" Written by Donald Roeser Performed by Blue Öyster Cult
 "I Wanna Be Your Boyfriend" Written by Douglas Colvin, Thomas Erdelyi, Jeff Hyman and John Cummings Performed by The Ramones
 "Time Has Come Today" Written by Joseph Chamber and Willie Chambers Performed by The Chambers Brothers
 "Uh-Oh Love Comes to Town" Written by David Byrne Performed by Talking Heads
 "Juke Box Music" Written by Ray Davies Performed by The Kinks
 "Let’s Go" Written by Richard Orasek Performed by Band of Warhols
 "Bang a Gong (Get It On)" Written by Marc Bolan Performed by Marc Bolan
 "Air That I Breathe" Written by Albert Hammond and Michael Hardwood Performed by Band of Warhols
 "Heart of Glass" Written by Debbie Harry and Chris Stein Performed by Band of Warhols
 "Pomp and Circumstance" Written by Sir Edward Edgar Performed by Parkrose High School Band
 "The Walk" Performed by Imogen Heap

External links
The official site
 
 
 http://www.plume-noire.com/movies/reviews/nearinggrace.html
 http://www.hollywoodreporter.com/thr/search/article_display.jsp?vnu_content_id=1000965778

2005 films
2005 drama films
Films based on American novels
Films set in Oregon
Films shot in Portland, Oregon
American teen drama films
Whitewater Films films
Films directed by Rick Rosenthal
2000s English-language films
2000s American films